Minty may refer to:

relating to the mint plant Mentha
Spearmint (flavour)
Minty (band), a band founded by Leigh Bowery in 1993 
Minty (TV series), a 1998 Australian–British comedy series
Minty: A Story of Young Harriet Tubman, a 1996 children's picture book
Minty, Poland, a village
Emil Minty (born 1972), former actor
Minty Peterson, a fictional character in the British TV series EastEnders

See also
Mint (disambiguation)
Minties, a brand of confectionery